Chevrolatella tripunctata is a species of beetle in the family Cerambycidae, the only species in the genus Chevrolatella.

References

Trachyderini
Monotypic Cerambycidae genera